Spring Hill is a section of Norwalk, Connecticut named after the hill on which most of the neighborhood sits. The neighborhood is located west of the Central section of Norwalk, across U.S. Route 7 and north of Interstate 95 and U.S. Route 1. Norwalk Hospital is on the eastern edge of the neighborhood. Riverside Cemetery is on the northeastern edge.

About 9,000 people live in Spring Hill, a densely populated part of the city where condominiums have been built in recent decades. The Spring Hill Neighborhood Association is an advocacy group for the community.

In 2008, the parks committee of the First Taxing District of Norwalk agreed to create a park out of a  tract surrounding the water towers in the neighborhood (bordered by Dover Street, Grandview Avenue and Magnolia Street). The property includes several oak trees that are about 150 years old. Up until the creation of the park, the neighborhood was the only one in Norwalk without a park.

Norwalk Hospital is a major landowner in the neighborhood. The parcels contain houses, condominiums and medical facilities.

Jefferson Science Magnet School is located in Spring Hill.

Notes

Geography of Norwalk, Connecticut
Neighborhoods in Connecticut